Gondeh Jin (also Romanized as Gondeh Jīn, Gandehjīn, and Gondehjīn; also known as Gandhīn and Ganeh Jīn) is a village in Abrumand Rural District, in the Central District of Bahar County, Hamadan Province, Iran. At the 2006 census, its population was 923, in 200 families.

References 

Populated places in Bahar County